The Ultimate Fighter: Latin America 3 is an installment of the Ultimate Fighting Championship (UFC)-produced reality television series The Ultimate Fighter.

On May 31, 2016, the UFC announced that the 16 competitors for the season would be made up of lightweight fighters from various locations around Latin America.

The cast consisted of fighters from 9 countries: Bedoya, from Colombia, Castillo, from Nicaragua, Cárdenas and Villaseca, from Chile, Chalo, from Venezuela, Flores, from Bolivia, Puelles, from Peru, Ganin and Rojo, from Argentina, Zamora, from Costa Rica and Bravo, Martínez, Quintanar, Rodríguez, Sabori and Villegas, from Mexico.

The coaches for the season are former UFC Light Heavyweight champions Forrest Griffin and Chuck Liddell. Both retired fighters have been coaches on previous The Ultimate Fighter installments.

Filming for the season began on May 16 in Buenos Aires, Argentina.

Cast

Teams
Team Griffin:
Forrest Griffin, Head Coach
 
Team Liddell:
Chuck Liddell, Head Coach

Fighters
 Team Griffin
 Martín Bravo
 Pablo Sabori
 Miguel Villegas
 Marcelo Rojo
 Alejandro Martínez
 Yasser Castillo
 Walter Zamora
 José David Flores
 Team Liddell
 Claudio Puelles
 Ilianovich Chalo
 Leonardo Rodríguez
 Javier Ganin
 John Bedoya
 Santiago Cárdenas
 Fabian Quintanar
 Juan Villaseca

Episodes
Episode 1:
Pablo Sabori defeated Santiago Cardenas via submission (armbar) in round 1.

Episode 2:
Claudio Puelles defeated Jose David Flores via TKO (punches) in round 1.
Walter Zamora defeated John Bedoya via majority decision after 2 rounds.

Episode 3:
Ilianovich Chalo defeated Miguel Villegas via KO (punch) in round 1.
Marcelo Rojo defeated Juan Villaseca via submission (rear naked choke) in round 1.

Episode 4:
Leonardo Rodriguez defeated Yasser Castillo via majority decision after 2 rounds.
Martín Bravo defeated Javier Ganin via TKO (knee injury) in round 1.

Episode 5:
Alejandro Martinez defeated Fabian Quintanar via split decision after 3 rounds.
John Bedoya replaces Alejandro Martinez due to him being unable to continue as he was suffering with injuries from his fight with Quintanar.

Episode 6:
Claudio Puelles defeated Pablo Sabori via submission (kneebar) in round 1.
Leonardo Rodriguez defeated Walter Zamora via unanimous decision after 2 rounds.

Episode 7:
Martín Bravo defeated Ilianovich Chalo via unanimous decision after 2 rounds.

Episode 8:
Marcelo Rojo defeated John Bedoya via majority decision after 2 rounds.

Episode 9:
Martín Bravo defeated Leonardo Rodriguez via unanimous decision after 3 rounds.

Episode 10:
Claudio Puelles defeated Marcelo Rojo via unanimous decision after 3 rounds.

Season Bracket

* Martínez was unable to fight due to injury. Bedoya was chosen to take his spot in the quarterfinals.

The Ultimate Fighter Latin America 3 Finale: dos Anjos vs. Ferguson

The Ultimate Fighter Latin America 3 Finale: dos Anjos vs. Ferguson (also known as UFC Fight Night 98) was a mixed martial arts event held on November 5, 2016, at Arena Ciudad de México in Mexico City, Mexico

Background
A potential lightweight title eliminator bout between former UFC Lightweight Champion Rafael dos Anjos and The Ultimate Fighter: Team Lesnar vs. Team dos Santos winner Tony Ferguson headlined the event.

The lightweight finale of The Ultimate Fighter: Latin America 3 was contested at the event.

The Ultimate Fighter: Team Jones vs. Team Sonnen middleweight winner Kelvin Gastelum was expected to face Jorge Masvidal in a welterweight bout at the event. However, on September 14, Gastelum was removed in favor of a replacement bout against former lightweight title challenger Donald Cerrone at UFC 205, one week later. Subsequently, Masvidal was removed from the card entirely rescheduled to face Jake Ellenberger the following month at The Ultimate Fighter: Tournament of Champions Finale.

As a result of the cancellation of UFC Fight Night: Lamas vs. Penn, a bout between Sam Alvey and Alex Nicholson was rescheduled for this event.

Guido Cannetti was expected to face Marco Beltrán in a rematch at the event. The pairing first met at one of The Ultimate Fighter: Latin America's tournament bouts where Beltrán won a controversial decision. However, on October 29, Cannetti was pulled from the bout after USADA revealed a potential anti-doping violation from a sample taken October 15. He was replaced by former Bellator Featherweight Champion and one time UFC Bantamweight Championship challenger Joe Soto and the bout was contested at a catchweight of 140 lb.

At the event's weigh-ins, Charles Oliveira failed to make the featherweight limit for his fight with Ricardo Lamas, coming in nine pounds over the 146 lb weight allowance. He was fined 30 percent of his earnings, and Lamas and promotion officials insisted that Oliveira not weigh more than 160 lb the day of the fight or the fight would be cancelled. Felipe Arantes also missed weight for his bout against Érik Pérez, coming in two pounds over the bantamweight weight allowance. He was fined 20 percent of his purse.

Results

Bonus awards
The following fighters were awarded $50,000 bonuses:
Fight of the Night: Tony Ferguson vs. Rafael dos Anjos
Performance of the Night: Ricardo Lamas and Douglas Silva de Andrade

Aftermath
On August 21, 2017, it was announced that Cannetti was given a 10-month suspension by USADA, retroactive to October 28, 2016. The provisional suspension came after testing positive for ostarine, hydrochlorothiazide and chlorothiazide. USADA conducted tests on the supplements Cannetti was taking at the time of the sample collection, and concluded that the supplements were tainted.

See also
The Ultimate Fighter
List of UFC events
2016 in UFC

References

2010s American reality television series
The Ultimate Fighter episodes
Mixed martial arts in Mexico
2016 in mixed martial arts
Sports competitions in Mexico City